Golaghat Assembly constituency is one of the 126 assembly constituencies of Assam Legislative Assembly. Golaghat forms part of the Kaliabor Lok Sabha constituency.
Ajanta Neog has been the most successful candidate in this constituency, winning it consecutively five times since 2001.

Members of Legislative Assembly 
 1951: Rajendranath Barua, Indian National Congress
 1957: Rajendranath Barua, Indian National Congress
 1962: Dandeswar Hazarika, Indian National Congress
 1967: Soneswar Bora, Samyukta Socialist Party
 1972: Soneswar Bora, Socialist Party
 1978: Soneswar Bora, Janata Party
 1983: Nagen Neog, Indian National Congress
 1985: Debeswar Bora, Independent
 1991: Nagen Neog, Indian National Congress
 1996: Atul Bora, Asom Gana Parishad
 2001: Ajanta Neog, Indian National Congress
 2006: Ajanta Neog, Indian National Congress
 2011: Ajanta Neog, Indian National Congress
 2016: Ajanta Neog, Indian National Congress 
2021: Ajanta Neog, Bharatiya Janata Party

Election results

2021 result

2016 result

2011 result

References

External links 
 

Assembly constituencies of Assam
Local government in Golaghat